Tonie is a Swedish unisex given name and a nickname that is a diminutive form of Antonia in Sweden. It is also a Dutch unisex given name that is a diminutive form of Antonia, Antonius, Anton, Antoon, Anthonis, and Anthoon in use in Suriname, South Africa, Namibia, Indonesia, Belgium and Netherlands. Notable people with this name include the following:

Given name
Tonie Carroll (born 1976), New Zealander rugby footballer
Tonie Marshall (1951–2020), French actress, screenwriter, and film director
Tonie Walsh (born 1960), Irish LGBT rights activist, journalist, disc jockey

Nickname
Tonie Campbell nickname of Anthony Eugene Campbell (born 1960), American athlete
Tonie Nathan Theodora Nathalia Nathan (1923 – 2014), American political figure

See also

Toine, name
Tone (disambiguation)
Tonge (surname)
Toni, name
Tonia (name)
Tonic (disambiguation)
Tonies
Tonin (disambiguation)
Tonio (name)
Tonite (disambiguation)
Tonje (name)
Tonne (name)
Tonnie
Tonye
Towie (disambiguation)
Townie (disambiguation)
Tonic Chabalala

References

Nicknames
Dutch feminine given names
Dutch masculine given names
Swedish feminine given names
Swedish masculine given names